Esther Regina Largman is a Brazilian author.  Her works have been recognized by the Brazilian government and are now a part of the high school curriculum in Brazilian schools.

Published works
Jovens Polacas (1992)
Jan e Nassau (1996)
Tio Kuba nos Trópicos (1999)
O Milionésimo Café de Augusta e Da Janela (2003)
Judeus nos Trópicos (2003)
Included in Contemporary Jewish Writing in Brazil (2009)

References

Year of birth missing (living people)
Living people
Brazilian women writers
Brazilian writers
Jewish Brazilian writers